The Austin Film Critics Association Award for Best Ensemble is an annual award given by the Austin Film Critics Association, honoring the best in ensemble cast. This category was first awarded in 2018.

Winners

2010s

2020s

References

Austin Film Critics Association Awards